Potamocarcinus is a genus of crabs in the family Pseudothelphusidae.

Potamocarcinus armatus H. Milne-Edwards, 1853
Potamocarcinus aspoekorum (Pretzmann, 1968)
Potamocarcinus chajulensis Alvarez & Villalobos, 1998
Potamocarcinus colombiensis von Prahl & Ramos, 1987
Potamocarcinus falcatus (Rodríguez & Hobbs, 1989)
Potamocarcinus hartmanni Pretzmann, 1975
Potamocarcinus leptomelus Rodríguez & Hobbs, 1989
Potamocarcinus lobulatus Campos & Lemaitre, 2002
Potamocarcinus magnus (Rathbun, 1895)
Potamocarcinus nicaraguensis Rathbun, 1893
Potamocarcinus pinzoni Campos, 2003
Potamocarcinus poglayeneuwalli Pretzmann, 1978
Potamocarcinus richmondi (Rathbun, 1893)
Potamocarcinus roatensis Rodríguez & López, 2003
Potamocarcinus vulcanensis Rodríguez, 2001
Potamocarcinus zilchi (Bott, 1956)

References

Pseudothelphusidae
Taxa named by Henri Milne-Edwards